Detroit City Apartments  is a high-rise in downtown Detroit, Michigan. Built in 1981 and named Trolley Plaza for nearby Washington Boulevard trolley line, the residential building stands 28 stories tall. The building is located at 1431 Washington Boulevard and occupies the block bordered by Clifford Street, Grand River Avenue and Washington Boulevard. In 2009, Village Green  purchased the building and changed the name of the high-rise apartments to Washington Square. In 2013, Washington Square became the Detroit City Apartments.

The property consists of a 5-floor parking structure topped by 23 floors of residential apartments. The 6th floor, which extends out of the parking structure, includes the lobby, swimming pool, health club, tennis court, and other amenities. Two-story, townhouse-style penthouse suites fill the 27th and 28th floors.

References

External links
 Detroit City Apartments
 Google Maps location of Washington Square
 Trolley Plaza details at Emporis.com
SkyscraperPage.com's Profile on Washington Square Apartments

Apartment buildings in Detroit
1981 establishments in Michigan
Residential skyscrapers in Detroit